EWU may refer to:

 Ewu, a town in Nigeria
 East West University, a private university in Dhaka, Bangladesh
 East–West University, a private university in Chicago, Illinois, United States
 Eastern Washington University, a public university in Cheney, Washington, United States
 Newtok Airport, in Alaska
 European Wrestling Union, defunct professional wrestling association, original sponsors of the European Heavyweight Championship